Lamouri Ben Kadda Djediat (born December 20, 1982) is an Algerian footballer who plays for USM Bel-Abbès in the Algerian Ligue Professionnelle 1.

Club career
Born in Sour El-Ghozlane, Djediat began his career in the junior ranks of his hometown club of Entente Sour El Ghozlane. In 2003, he joined newly promoted Algerian Championnat National 2 side Paradou AC.

ES Sétif
In June 2007, after four seasons with Paradou, Djediat joined defending Algerian Championnat National champions ES Sétif. ES Sétif paid a transfer fee of 22,000,000 Algerian dinars, the highest transfer fee in Algeria at the time.

In his first season with the club, he helped the club retain its Arab Champions League title, beating Wydad Casablanca 2-0 o aggregate in the final. Djediat was chosen as the best player of the competition.

ASO Chlef
On August 24, 2010, Djediat signed a one-year contract with ASO Chlef. In his first season with the club, Djediat made 24 league appearances, scoring 5 goals, to lead ASO Chlef to its first league title.

USM Alger
On July 27, 2011, Djediat signed a one-year contract with USM Alger. On September 10, 2011, he made his official debut for the club as a starter in a league match against CA Batna, scoring a goal in the 42nd minute.

Honours

Club
 Won the Arab Champions League twice
 Once with ES Sétif in 2008
 Once with USM Alger in 2013
 Won the Algerian Ligue Professionnelle 1 twice:
 Once with ES Sétif in 2009
 Once with ASO Chlef in 2011
 Won the Algerian Cup twice
 Cnce with ES Sétif in 2010
 Once with USM Alger in 2013
 Won the North African Cup of Champions once with ES Sétif in 2009

Individual
 Chosen as the Best Player of the 2007–08 Arab Champions League
 Top scorer of the 2012–13 UAFA Club Cup

References

External links
 
 

1982 births
Living people
Algerian footballers
Association football midfielders
Algeria international footballers
ASO Chlef players
ES Sétif players
Paradou AC players
USM Alger players
CR Belouizdad players
USM Bel Abbès players
Algerian Ligue Professionnelle 1 players
People from Bouïra Province
Competitors at the 2001 Mediterranean Games
Mediterranean Games competitors for Algeria
21st-century Algerian people